Wi Ha-joon (born Wi Hyun-yi; August 5, 1991) is a South Korean actor and model. He is best known for his roles in the films Gonjiam: Haunted Asylum (2018), Shark: The Beginning (2021) and Midnight (2021), as well as the television series Something in the Rain (2018), Romance Is a Bonus Book (2019), 18 Again (2020), and Squid Game (2021), the lattermost of which brought him international fame. In 2022, Wi was named one of GQ Koreas Men of the Year.

Early life and education 
Wi was born on August 5, 1991, on the island of Soando, South Jeolla Province, South Korea, and was raised on his family's abalone farm. He attended Sungkyul University, majoring in theatre and film.

Career 

Wi made his acting debut in 2012, starring in a short film, Peace in Them. As of September 2021, he is managed by MSTeam Entertainment. Wi was widely known for his portrayal as Hwang Jun-ho in the 2021 South Korean web series, Squid Game.

Filmography

Film

Television series

Web series

Discography

Singles

Ambassadorship 
 Public relations ambassador from Soan-myeon (2022)

Awards and nominations

Listicles

Notes

References

External links
 
 
 

1991 births
Living people
South Korean male film actors
South Korean male television actors
South Korean male models
People from South Jeolla Province
21st-century South Korean male actors
South Korean male web series actors